Loch Skeen or Loch Skene is a loch in Dumfries and Galloway in the south of Scotland. It is located about 10 miles to the north-east of Moffat and feeds the 60-metre (200 ft) high Grey Mare's Tail waterfall. The area around Loch Skeen is popular with hikers, and the Daily Telegraph included Loch Skeen in a list of Britain's finest one-day and half-day walks. It is the highest loch in the Southern Uplands at approximately 510m.

References

External links 

 Loch Skeen, Gazetteer for Scotland

Lochs of Dumfries and Galloway
Freshwater lochs of Scotland